Jeremy McKenzie (born 23 April 1905, date of death unknown) was a Guyanese cricketer. He played in four first-class matches for British Guiana in 1928/29 and 1929/30.

See also
 List of Guyanese representative cricketers

References

External links
 

1905 births
Year of death missing
Guyanese cricketers
Guyana cricketers
Sportspeople from Georgetown, Guyana